Fang Shengdong (1886–1911) was a late Qing dynasty revolutionary, He was Killed during the Second Guangzhou Uprising.

References

1886 births
1911 deaths
Chinese revolutionaries
Qing dynasty people
People from Fuzhou
Tongmenghui members